In mathematical logic, the Barwise compactness theorem, named after Jon Barwise, is a generalization of the usual compactness theorem for first-order logic to a certain class of infinitary languages.  It was stated and proved by Barwise in 1967.

Statement

Let  be a countable admissible set. Let  be an -finite relational language. Then  is satisfiable.

References

External links
 Stanford Encyclopedia of Philosophy: "Infinitary Logic", Section 5, "Sublanguages of L(ω1,ω) and the Barwise Compactness Theorem"

Theorems in the foundations of mathematics
Mathematical logic
Metatheorems